Konthayum Poonulum is a 2014 Indian Malayalam-language family drama film directed by Jijo Antony. It stars Kunchako Boban, Bhama and Manoj K Jayan in the lead.

Plot 

A baker named Krishnan rushes home to be with his heavily pregnant wife Amritha, who has been left home alone. Also at home is his dear friend Martin, who is jobless.  Krishnan and Martin reconnect once Krishnan returns home.

A police officer named Mathachan, picks up a lady named Annie from the streets, but she suddenly disappears into thin air, making him fear she is supernatural, since earlier he has made fun of his wife's spiritual beliefs.

An old man named Freddy doesn't know whom to turn to when an accident leaves his daughter Alice and granddaughter in a critical state. A bunch of girls in a hostel decide try out a Ouija board, which sends one of them wandering into a cemetery in the dead of the night.

A money lender named Sethu, who has developed an imaginary, invisible friend called Johny, with whom he shares drinks, is shocked to find Johny following him one day. True to his character, Johny is invisible to everyone else, which sends Sethu into a delirium. An old time photographer named Aloshi's exploration of the supernatural leads him to the mortuary.

Cast

 Kunchako Boban as Krishnan
 Bhama as Amrutha
 Shine Tom Chacko as Martin
 Kalabhavan Mani as Police officer Mathachan
 Kavitha Nair as Annie
 Janardhanan as Baby
Satthya 
 Anju Aravind as Alice
 Manoj K Jayan as Sethu
 Saiju Kurup as Jacob
 Joy Mathew as Aloshi
 Shobha Mohan as Mary
 Sarayu
 Poojitha Menon as Ann
 Poojappura Ravi as Ramettan
 Indrans as Hamsakka
 Sona Nair as Lathika, Sethu's wife
 Kundara Johny as Sandeep Mohan
 Narayanankutty as Rajappan, Photographer
 Kanakalatha as Nun
 T Parvathy as Lekha

References

External links
 

2014 films
2010s Malayalam-language films
2014 crime thriller films
2014 directorial debut films

Indian romantic drama films
Indian romantic thriller films
2014 romantic drama films
2010s romantic thriller films
Indian crime thriller films